Japanese Navy can refer to:
 the Imperial Japanese Navy, 1868–1945
 the Japan Maritime Self-Defense Force, 1954–present